Lukáš Krejčí (born 21 July 1969) is a Slovak biathlete. He competed in the men's 20 km individual event at the 1994 Winter Olympics.

References

External links
 

1969 births
Living people
Slovak male biathletes
Olympic biathletes of Slovakia
Biathletes at the 1994 Winter Olympics
Sportspeople from Prague